Tim Smyczek was the defending champion but lost in the second round to Thai-Son Kwiatkowski.

Tommy Paul won the title after defeating Peter Polansky 6–2, 6–2 in the final.

Seeds

Draw

Finals

Top half

Bottom half

References
Main Draw
Qualifying Draw

Charlottesville Men's Pro Challenger - Singles
2018 Singles